2014 Kyoto Sanga FC season.

J2 League

References

External links
 J.League official site

Kyoto Sanga FC
Kyoto Sanga FC seasons